The DURO (Durable Robust) is a series of wheeled, multi-purpose military transport vehicles produced by General Dynamics European Land Systems/MOWAG in both four and six wheel drive. It was initially developed for Switzerland by Bucher-Guyer AG in Niederweningen, Switzerland. An initial 3000 vehicles order for the Swiss Armed Forces came through in 1994. In January 2003 the production was transferred to MOWAG in Kreuzlingen. Over 4,000 DURO 4x4 and 6x6 vehicles are now in service worldwide.  Main customers are Switzerland, Germany, Venezuela, and the UK. In addition to these, the vehicle is used in many other countries for special purposes.

DURO I

DURO II

DURO III

The DURO III is available as a 4x4, 6x6, and an armoured 6x6 with modular shelter.

DURO IIIP / DURO GMTF
The DURO IIIP  ( also named DURO GMTF) is a version only available in 6x6 form. It is heavily armoured and has a remote controlled machine-gun. It is used by the Danish Army as an ambulance, and by the Swiss Army in the roles of APC, NBC-Reconnaissance and ambulance in international peace support missions of Swissint. The DURO IIIP is also used by Germany.

YAK
The YAK is an upgraded, ballistic and mine-protected, variant of the DURO IIIP 6x6 chassis used by the German Army. It is made by Rheinmetall MAN Military Vehicles.

The German Army uses the YAK for a variety of roles. The first batch of DURO III vehicles for Germany consisted of 30 vehicles, these consisting of ambulance (12), Explosive Ordnance Disposal (EOD) (10), military police (four) and support vehicles for the LUNA Unmanned Aerial Vehicle (four). Final deliveries were made late in 2005. Another 100 vehicles were ordered with deliveries between 2006 and 2009. The actual contract covered the supply of 100 Yak chassis and a total of 114 bodies in the following configurations: 31 × mobile medical team; 8 × prisoner transport; 6 × water cannon; 23 × command post for military police; 23 × air base security; 2 × military geography; 21 × explosive ordnance disposal. Late in 2007 an order was placed by the German Army for another batch of seven Yak vehicles, six additional LUNA ground stations and a BIO reconnaissance vehicle.

In 2008 RMMV delivered three armoured NBC field laboratories to the Swiss Army which are similar to the Yak.

MOWAG Eagle IV and V

The MOWAG Eagle IV and V were based on the DURO IIIP chassis.

Civil use
The 4X4 and 6X6 Duro was also offered in various configurations as a fire engine:
Emergency vehicle for up to 16 firefighters
Hose laying vehicle with 2 x 1000m hoses.
Small fire engine with fire 800l tank
Liquid transporter 800l water & 100l foam.

These vehicles are in use in different fire units in Switzerland, such as the fire departments of Bern, Frick, Baar.

In the 1990s, consideration was given to introducing the Duro to the fire service of the former GDR as a substitute for the Robur LO. Robur and Duro have similar exterior dimensions, therefore existing fire houses required no structural alterations for new vehicles. The conversion failed due to the purchase price of Duro, which exceeded the financial strength of the fire departments.

The 4x4 Duro was also offered as a commercial vehicle for communities and municipalities as dump trucks or with solid aluminum construction as service vehicles, but there were no significant sales. Also in the configuration as a civilian ambulance, there were no successes.

A small number of vehicles are provided as expedition vehicles, privately owned. Converted from civilian companies or individuals as offroad campers, coach expedition and expedition vehicle based on 4x4 and 6x6 Duros.

Operators

Current operators
  Policía Boliviana

See also
 AGF (Light infantry vehicle)
 Armoured Multi-Purpose Vehicle (AMPV)
 ATF Dingo
 Boxer (Armoured Fighting Vehicle)
 KMW Grizzly
 LAPV Enok
 Mungo ESK
 Pinzgauer High Mobility All-Terrain Vehicle - a rather similar, but older, Austrian vehicle
 RMMV TPz (Transportpanzer) Fuchs

Gallery

References

External links

Duro 3 on the Homepage of the German Army
Duro IIIP brochure
Danish DURO IIIP

Armoured fighting vehicles of Germany
Armoured fighting vehicles of the post–Cold War period
Armoured personnel carriers
Military trucks of Switzerland
Off-road vehicles
Post–Cold War military vehicles of Germany
Yak
Military vehicles introduced in the 1990s